Roberto Piumini is an Italian writer, known particularly for his children's stories.

Life

Roberto Piumini was born in the town of Edolo in northern Italy and graduated with a degree in pedagogy from the Università Cattolica in Milan. His first book, Il giovane che entrava nel palazzo,  won the first edition of the Cento Prize for children's books, chaired by author Gianni Rodari. During his long and prolific career he has written stories and poetry for readers of all ages  and has been awarded numerous prizes. He is regarded as one of Italy's "most beloved children's authors".

Selected works
 Il giovane che entrava nel palazzo (1978)
 Il Cuoco prigioniero (1985), on which was based the animated film Totò Sapore e la magica storia della pizza
 Il carro a sei ruote (1986)
 Lo stralisco (1987)
 Motu-Iti. L'isola dei gabbiani (1989)
 Denis del pane (1992)
 Mattia e il nonno(1993)
 Caratteristiche del bosco sacro (2000)
 Il diavolo al mulino (2001)
 La nuova Commedia di Dante (2004)
 L'amatore (2011)
 L'amorosa figura (2013)
 Tre fratelli Piumini (2013)
 I silenziosi strumenti d'amore (2014)
 Shakespeare in versi (2017)
 Alzati, Martin (2018)
 La rosa di Brod (2019)
 La barba del Manzoni (2020)
 Kintaro. Il ragazzo d'oro (2021)
His lyrics have been set to music by Enzo Rao for songs performed by Oriana Civile

Works in translation
English translations of stories told or retold by Roberto Piumini include:
 The Tortoise and the Hare, illustrated by Barbara Nascimbeni (2011)
 The Selfish Giant, illustrated by Nicoletta Costa (2011)
Glowrushes, translated by Leah Janeczko (2022)
His stories have been translated into numerous other languages including French, German, Dutch, and Polish.
His poem Is There Something in the Air?, a "playful antivirus made of words", has been translated into over 40 languages.

Awards
1979 - Cento Prize for Il giovane che entrava nel palazzo
1983 - Premio Andersen Baia delle favole
1984 - Premio Le Palme d'oro for Storie dell'orizzonte 
1991 - Premio letterario Piero Chiara
1994 - Vlag en Wimpel award for the Dutch translation of Mattia e il nonno
1995 - Vlag en Wimpel award for the Dutch translation of Lo stralisco
1995 - Premio Dessì  for La rosa di Brod
1995 - Premio Cento for Denis del pane 
1998 - Rattenfänger-Literaturpreis Hameln for the German translation of Motu-Iti: l'isola dei gabbiani
2012 - Premio Settembrini for L'amatore, (2011)
2014 - Premio Graziosi Terra lifetime achievement award, in particular for Mattia e il nonno
2020 - Premio Andersen - Trofeo Baia delle Favole for Nel regno di Bistoria
2020 - Premio Rodari lifetime achievement award

References

External links
  (in Italian)

Italian children's writers
Living people
Year of birth missing (living people)